Jake Zamansky (born June 26, 1981) is an American alpine ski racer who has competed since 1997. His best World Cup finish was 15th at a giant slalom event in Italy in 2009.

At the FIS Alpine World Ski Championships 2009 in Val d'Isère, Zamansky did not finish the giant slalom event.

He was named to the US Olympic Team for the 2010 Winter Olympics in late 2009.

References

1981 births
Alpine skiers at the 2010 Winter Olympics
American male alpine skiers
Living people
Olympic alpine skiers of the United States